NGC 1360, also known as the Robin's Egg Nebula,  is a planetary nebula in the constellation of Fornax. It was identified as a planetary nebula due to its strong radiation in the OIII (oxygen) bands. Reddish matter, believed to have been ejected from the original star before its final collapse, is visible in images. It is slightly fainter than IC 2003.

The central star of the system was suspected to be binary since 1977, but was only confirmed in 2017.

NGC 1360 was discovered in January 1868 by the German astronomer Friedrich August Theodor Winnecke.

References

External links

 http://observing.skyhound.com/archives/dec/NGC_1360.html

Planetary nebulae
1360
Fornax (constellation)